Exix is a genus of braconid wasps in the family Braconidae. There are about seven described species in Exix, found in North, Central, and South America.

Species
These seven species belong to the genus Exix:
 Exix bahia Mason, 1981
 Exix colorados Mason, 1981
 Exix columbica Mason, 1981
 Exix itatiaia Souza-Gessner, Bortoni & Penteado-Dias, 2016
 Exix mexicana Mason, 1981
 Exix schunkei (Nixon, 1965)
 Exix tinalandica Mason, 1981

References

Further reading

 
 
 

Microgastrinae